Deron Andrew Winn (born June 13, 1989) is an American mixed martial artist and freestyle wrestler. A professional mixed martial artist since 2017, he formerly competed with the Ultimate Fighting Championship (UFC) and Bellator MMA, fighting in their middleweight divisions.

Background and wrestling career
Winn was born and raised in Liberty, Missouri. He began wrestling for Liberty High School, where he became a three-time MSHSAA state champion and compiled a record of 163–6.

After high school, Winn attended St. Louis Community College–Meramec where he won the NJCAA national junior college championship and earned the NJCAA Outstanding Wrestler award as a true freshman. In his sophomore year he was awarded All-American status.

Following his career at St. Louis Community College, in his senior year he transferred to the wrestling program of Lindenwood University where he earned NAIA All-American honors by advancing to the NAIA Wrestling Championships, where he placed third at nationals.

After his successful collegiate wrestling career, he focused in freestyle wrestling, where he competed nationally and internationally, compiled wins over notable wrestlers such as J'den Cox and Pat Downey and also placed at competitions such as the US Open, the Pan American Championships and the US World Team Trials. After more than two years since his last wrestling showdown, Winn wrestled the heavily accomplished in collegiate wrestling Kollin Moore on August 30, 2020, at Chael Sonnen's Wrestling Underground I. He lost the match by decision.

Mixed martial arts career

Early career
After failing to make it to the 2016 Summer Olympics wrestling team, Winn relocated to California in 2016 to continue training mixed martial arts. He began his professional career in 2017 and fought under various promotions, most notably Bellator MMA. He amassed an undefeated record of 5–0 with all but one of his wins ending by knockout in the first round. On December 20, 2018, it was announced that Winn had signed with the UFC.

Ultimate Fighting Championship
Winn was scheduled to make his promotional debut against Markus Perez on June 22, 2019, at UFC Fight Night 154. However, on May 9 it was reported that Perez had pulled out of the fight citing injury and was replaced by Bruno Silva. On June 16, it was reported that Silva was forced to pull out of the contest due to a potential anti-doping violation by USADA and was replaced by returning veteran Eric Spicely. He won the fight by unanimous decision. This win earned both competitors the Fight of the Night award.

Winn faced Darren Stewart on October 18, 2019, at UFC on ESPN 6. At the weigh-in, Winn weighed in at 188.5 pounds, 2.5 pounds over the middleweight non-title fight limit of 186. The bout was held at catchweight and he was fined 20% of his purse which went to his opponent. He lost the fight by split decision.

Winn faced Gerald Meerschaert on March 7, 2020, at UFC 248. He lost the fight via submission in the third round. Winn was suspended for nine months and fined $1,800 of his purse by the Nevada State Athletic Commission on September 3, 2020, after testing positive for amphetamines. The suspension was retroactive to March 7, 2020, and he became eligible to compete again on December 7, 2020.

Winn was scheduled to face Antônio Braga Neto on December 19, 2020, at UFC Fight Night: Thompson vs. Neal. However, Braga Neto was removed from the contest due to undisclosed reasons and replaced by Antônio Arroyo. Winn won the fight via unanimous decision.

Winn was scheduled to face Phil Hawes at UFC on ESPN 26 on July 17, 2021. However, Winn was forced to pull out from the event, citing separated rib and torn cartilage, and the bout was rescheduled at UFC Fight Night 194 on October 9, 2021. In turn, Winn withdrew the day before the event due to health issues. He was briefly expected to be replaced by Chris Curtis, however Hawes declined the bout and it was ultimately scrapped.

Winn faced Phil Hawes on June 18, 2022, at UFC on ESPN 37. He lost the bout in the second round via standing TKO stoppage.

Winn was scheduled to face Julian Marquez on December 17, 2022, at UFC Fight Night 216. However, just two days before the event, Winn was forced to withdraw after fainting and falling down a set of stairs, at the UFC Performance Institute, sustaining a minor concussion.

Winn was released by UFC on late December 2022.

Personal life
Winn is in a relationship with fellow mixed martial artist Mallory Martin.

He has openly talked about his late father's homelessness and alcoholism, and his older brother's drug addiction.

Championships and accomplishments

Mixed martial arts
Ultimate Fighting Championship
Fight of the Night (One time) vs. Eric Spicely

Freestyle wrestling
Sources:
United World Wrestling
2018 Bill Ferrell International Senior Freestyle Silver Medalist
2016 Dave Schultz Memorial International Open Senior Freestyle Silver Medalist
2016 Outstanding Ukrainian Memorial Open Senior Freestyle Bronze Medalist
2014 Pan American Championships Senior Freestyle Bronze Medalist
2014 Dave Schultz Memorial International Open Senior Freestyle Silver Medalist
2014 Bill Farrell International Open Senior Freestyle Silver Medalist
2013 Cerro Pelado International Senior Freestyle Bronze Medalist
USA Wrestling
2018 World Team Trials Challenge Tournament Senior Freestyle Silver Medalist 
2018 U.S. Open Senior Freestyle 4th Place
2015 U.S. Open Senior Freestyle 4th Place
2014 U.S. Open Senior Freestyle 4th Place
2014 U.S. World Team Trials Open Senior Freestyle 4th Place

Folkstyle Wrestling
National Association of Intercollegiate Athletics
NAIA  197 lb 3rd place out of Lindenwood University  (2011)
NAIA All-American out of Lindenwood University  (2011)
National Junior College Athletic Association
NJCAA 184 lb National Championship out of St. Louis Community College  (2008, 2010)
NJCAA All-American out of St. Louis Community College  (2008, 2010)
NJCAA Most Outstanding Wrestler out of St. Louis Community College  (2008)
Missouri State High School Activities Association
MSHSAA State Championship out of Liberty High School (2005, 2006, 2007)
MSHSAA All-State out of Liberty High School (2004, 2005, 2006, 2007)

Mixed martial arts record

|-
|Loss
|align=center|7–3
|Phil Hawes
|TKO (elbows)
|UFC on ESPN: Kattar vs. Emmett
|
|align=center|2
|align=center|4:25
|Austin, Texas, United States
|
|-
|Win
|align=center|7–2
|Antônio Arroyo
|Decision (unanimous)
|UFC Fight Night: Thompson vs. Neal
|
|align=center|3
|align=center|5:00
|Las Vegas, Nevada, United States
|
|-
|Loss
|align=center|6–2
|Gerald Meerschaert
|Submission (rear-naked choke)
|UFC 248
|
|align=center|3
|align=center|2:13
|Las Vegas, Nevada, United States
|
|-
|Loss
|align=center|6–1
|Darren Stewart
|Decision (split)
|UFC on ESPN: Reyes vs. Weidman
|
|align=center|3
|align=center|5:00
|Boston, Massachusetts, United States
|
|-
|Win
|align=center|6–0
|Eric Spicely
|Decision (unanimous)
|UFC Fight Night: Moicano vs. The Korean Zombie
|
|align=center|3
|align=center|5:00
|Greenville, South Carolina, United States
|
|-
|Win
|align=center|5–0
|Tom Lawlor
|Decision (unanimous)
|Golden Boy Promotions: Liddell vs. Ortiz 3
|
|align=center|3
|align=center|5:00
|Inglewood, California, United States
|
|-
|Win
|align=center|4–0
|Ahmed White
|TKO (punches)
|Bellator 199
|
|align=center|1
|align=center|2:32
|San Jose, California, United States
|
|-
|Win
|align=center|3–0
|Cody Sons
|TKO (punches)
|URCC 32 Fury: Battle of the Islands
|
|align=center|1
|align=center|1:57
|San Mateo, California, United States
|
|-
|Win
|align=center|2–0
|Deven Fisher
|TKO (punches)
|LFA Fight Night 1
|
|align=center|1
|align=center|1:40
|Sioux Falls, South Dakota, United States
|
|-
|Win
|align=center|1–0
|Mike Morales
|TKO (punches)
|Conquer Fighting Championship 3
|
|align=center|1
|align=center|0:28
|Richmond, California, United States
|
|-

Freestyle record

! colspan="7"| Freestyle matches
|-
!  Res.
!  Record
!  Opponent
!  Score
!  Date
!  Event
!  Location
|-
|Loss
|64-36
|align=left| Kollin Moore
|style="font-size:88%"|0-7
|style="font-size:88%"|August 30, 2020
|style="font-size:88%"|Chael Sonnen's Wrestling Underground I
|style="text-align:left;font-size:88%;" |
 United States
|-
! style=background:white colspan=7 |
|-
|Loss
|64-35
|align=left| Hayden Zillmer
|style="font-size:88%"|7-9
|style="font-size:88%" rowspan=3|May 29, 2018
|style="font-size:88%" rowspan=3|2018 US WTT Qualifiers
|style="text-align:left;font-size:88%;" rowspan=3| Rochester, Minnesota
|-
|Loss
|64-34
|align=left| Hayden Zillmer
|style="font-size:88%"|2-8
|-
|Win
|64-33
|align=left| Timmy McCall
|style="font-size:88%"|4-2
|-
! style=background:white colspan=7 |
|-
|Loss
|63-33
|align=left| Enock Francois
|style="font-size:88%"|Fall
|style="font-size:88%" rowspan=6|April 28, 2018
|style="font-size:88%" rowspan=6|2018 US Open Wrestling Championships
|style="text-align:left;font-size:88%;" rowspan=6|
 Las Vegas, Nevada
|-
|Win
|63-32
|align=left| Nikko Reyes
|style="font-size:88%"|Forfeit
|-
|Loss
|62-32
|align=left| J'den Cox
|style="font-size:88%"|0-3
|-
|Win
|62-31
|align=left| Matt Williams
|style="font-size:88%"|TF 11-0
|-
|Win
|61-31
|align=left| Leonel Perez
|style="font-size:88%"|TF 10-0
|-
|Win
|60-31
|align=left| Cody Walters
|style="font-size:88%"|3-1
|-
! style=background:white colspan=7 |
|-
|Loss
|59-31
|align=left| Ty Walz
|style="font-size:88%"|2-4
|style="font-size:88%" rowspan=3|March 20, 2018
|style="font-size:88%" rowspan=3|2018 Bill Farrell Memorial International
|style="text-align:left;font-size:88%;" rowspan=3| New York City, New York
|-
|Win
|59-30
|align=left| Serhii Mokhort
|style="font-size:88%"|Fall
|-
|Win
|58-30
|align=left| Blaize Cabell
|style="font-size:88%"|2-1
|-
! style=background:white colspan=7 |
|-
|Loss
|57-30
|align=left| Richard Perry
|style="font-size:88%"|2-5
|style="font-size:88%" rowspan=5|November 12, 2016
|style="font-size:88%" rowspan=5|2016 Bill Farrell Memorial International
|style="text-align:left;font-size:88%;" rowspan=5| New York City, New York
|-
|Win
|57-29
|align=left| Joshua Asper
|style="font-size:88%"|7-5
|-
|Loss
|56-29
|align=left| Austin Trotman
|style="font-size:88%"|TF 0-10
|-
|Win
|56-28
|align=left| Peter Renda
|style="font-size:88%"|11-5
|-
|Win
|55-28
|align=left| Kodirov Bakhodur
|style="font-size:88%"|Fall
|-
! style=background:white colspan=7 |
|-
|Loss
|54-28
|align=left| Richard Perry
|style="font-size:88%"|4-8
|style="font-size:88%" rowspan=3|January 30, 2015
|style="font-size:88%" rowspan=3|2016 US Olympic Team Trials
|style="text-align:left;font-size:88%;" rowspan=3| Iowa City, Iowa
|-
|Win
|54-27
|align=left| Austin Trotman
|style="font-size:88%"|12-6
|-
|Loss
|53-27
|align=left| Ed Ruth
|style="font-size:88%"|TF 0-10
|-
! style=background:white colspan=7 |
|-
|Win
|53-26
|align=left| Timmy McCall
|style="font-size:88%"|10-6
|style="font-size:88%" rowspan=5|April 3, 2016
|style="font-size:88%" rowspan=5|2016 US Senior Last Chance OTT Qualif
|style="text-align:left;font-size:88%;" rowspan=5| Cedar Falls, Iowa
|-
|Win
|52-26
|align=left| Robert Hamlin
|style="font-size:88%"|5-1
|-
|Win
|51-26
|align=left| Josh Asper
|style="font-size:88%"|7-3
|-
|Win
|50-26
|align=left| Frank Richmond
|style="font-size:88%"|TF 10-0
|-
|Win
|49-26
|align=left| Nick Heflin
|style="font-size:88%"|4-2
|-
! style=background:white colspan=7 |
|-
|Win
|48-26
|align=left| Dmytro Rochniak
|style="font-size:88%"|10-4
|style="font-size:88%" rowspan=4|February 11, 2016
|style="font-size:88%" rowspan=4|2016 XXth Outstanding Ukrainian Wrestlers and Coaches Memorial
|style="text-align:left;font-size:88%;" rowspan=4| Kyiv, Ukraine
|-
|Win
|47-26
|align=left| Bendegúz Tóth
|style="font-size:88%"|8-5
|-
|Loss
|46-26
|align=left| Ibragim Aldatov
|style="font-size:88%"|3-9
|-
|Win
|46-25
|align=left| Vahe Tamrazyan
|style="font-size:88%"|8-3
|-
! style=background:white colspan=7 |
|-
|Loss
|45-25
|align=left| Luvsandors Turtogh
|style="font-size:88%"|3-3
|style="font-size:88%" rowspan=2|February 6, 2016
|style="font-size:88%" rowspan=2|2016 Grand Prix Yaşar Doğu
|style="text-align:left;font-size:88%;" rowspan=2| Istanbul, Turkey
|-
|Win
|45-24
|align=left| Caner Demirtas
|style="font-size:88%"|4-2
|-
! style=background:white colspan=7 |
|-
|Loss
|44-24
|align=left| Austin Trotman
|style="font-size:88%"|8-9
|style="font-size:88%" rowspan=3|January 30, 2015
|style="font-size:88%" rowspan=3|2016 Dave Schultz Memorial International
|style="text-align:left;font-size:88%;" rowspan=3| Colorado Springs, Colorado
|-
|Win
|44-23
|align=left| Robert Hamlin
|style="font-size:88%"|7-1
|-
|Win
|43-23
|align=left| Zahid Valencia
|style="font-size:88%"|TF 10-0
|-
! style=background:white colspan=7 |
|-
|Loss
|42-23
|align=left| Jeffery Felix
|style="font-size:88%"|3-11
|style="font-size:88%" rowspan=3|December 18, 2015
|style="font-size:88%" rowspan=3|2015 US Senior Nationals
|style="text-align:left;font-size:88%;" rowspan=3| Las Vegas, Nevada
|-
|Win
|42-22
|align=left| Kallen Kleinschmidt
|style="font-size:88%"|6-0
|-
|Loss
|41-22
|align=left| Micah Burak
|style="font-size:88%"|2-5
|-
! style=background:white colspan=7 |
|-
|Loss
|41-21
|align=left| Chris Perry
|style="font-size:88%"|3-12
|style="font-size:88%" rowspan=3|June 14, 2015
|style="font-size:88%" rowspan=3|2015 US World Team Trials Challenge Tournament
|style="text-align:left;font-size:88%;" rowspan=3| Madison, Wisconsin
|-
|Win
|41-20
|align=left| Phil Keddy
|style="font-size:88%"|Fall
|-
|Loss
|40-20
|align=left| Jon Reader
|style="font-size:88%"|3-7
|-
! style=background:white colspan=7 |
|-
|Loss
|40-19
|align=left| Ed Ruth
|style="font-size:88%"|TF 2-12
|style="font-size:88%" rowspan=6|May 9, 2015
|style="font-size:88%" rowspan=6|2015 Las Vegas/ASICS US Senior Nationals
|style="text-align:left;font-size:88%;" rowspan=6| Las Vegas, Nevada
|-
|Win
|40-18
|align=left| Ryan Loder
|style="font-size:88%"|TF 10-0
|-
|Loss
|39-18
|align=left| Keith Gavin
|style="font-size:88%"|4-8
|-
|Win
|39-17
|align=left| Chris Perry
|style="font-size:88%"|7-3
|-
|Win
|38-17
|align=left| Pat Downey
|style="font-size:88%"|7-1
|-
|Win
|37-17
|align=left| Zac Slotten
|style="font-size:88%"|TF 10-0
|-
! style=background:white colspan=7 |
|-
|Loss
|36-17
|align=left| Richard Perry
|style="font-size:88%"|3-11
|style="font-size:88%" rowspan=2|March 5, 2015
|style="font-size:88%" rowspan=2|2015 Alexander Medved Prizes
|style="text-align:left;font-size:88%;" rowspan=2| Minsk, Belarus
|-
|Win
|36-16
|align=left| Yusup Melejayev
|style="font-size:88%"|1-1
|-
! style=background:white colspan=7 |
|-
|Loss
|35-16
|align=left| Richard Perry
|style="font-size:88%"|4-5
|style="font-size:88%" rowspan=5|November 7, 2014
|style="font-size:88%" rowspan=5|2014 Bill Farrell Memorial International
|style="text-align:left;font-size:88%;" rowspan=5| New York City, New York
|-
|Win
|35-15
|align=left| Jon Reader
|style="font-size:88%"|8-4
|-
|Win
|34-15
|align=left| Benjamin Bennett
|style="font-size:88%"|6-0
|-
|Win
|33-15
|align=left| Nathanael Rose
|style="font-size:88%"|TF 12-0
|-
|Win
|32-15
|align=left| Alex Brown-Theriault
|style="font-size:88%"|9-0
|-
! style=background:white colspan=7 |
|-
|Win
|31-15
|align=left| Ali Al-Rekabi
|style="font-size:88%"|8-5
|style="font-size:88%" rowspan=2|July 16, 2014
|style="font-size:88%" rowspan=2|2014 Pan American Wrestling Championships
|style="text-align:left;font-size:88%;" rowspan=2| Mexico City, México
|-
|Loss
|30-15
|align=left| Javier Cortina
|style="font-size:88%"|TF 0-11
|-
! style=background:white colspan=7 |
|-
|Loss
|30-14
|align=left| Dustin Kilgore
|style="font-size:88%"|1-5
|style="font-size:88%" rowspan=3|June 1, 2014
|style="font-size:88%" rowspan=3|2014 US World Team Trials Challenge Tournament
|style="text-align:left;font-size:88%;" rowspan=3| Madison, Wisconsin
|-
|Win
|30-13
|align=left| J'den Cox
|style="font-size:88%"|10-2
|-
|Win
|29-13
|align=left| Micah Burak
|style="font-size:88%"|6-0
|-
! style=background:white colspan=7 |
|-
|Loss
|28-13
|align=left| J. D. Bergman
|style="font-size:88%"|TF 0-10
|style="font-size:88%" rowspan=6|April 19, 2014
|style="font-size:88%" rowspan=6|2014 US Open Wrestling Championships
|style="text-align:left;font-size:88%;" rowspan=6| Las Vegas, Nevada
|-
|Win
|28-12
|align=left| David Zabriskie
|style="font-size:88%"|4-1
|-
|Loss
|27-12
|align=left| Jacob Varner
|style="font-size:88%"|TF 0-11
|-
|Win
|27-11
|align=left| Chris Pendleton
|style="font-size:88%"|9-5
|-
|Win
|26-11
|align=left| Cayle Byers
|style="font-size:88%"|Fall
|-
|Win
|25-11
|align=left| Brad Rabenstein
|style="font-size:88%"|TF 10-0
|-
! style=background:white colspan=7 |
|-
|Loss
|24-11
|align=left| Valeriy Andriytsev
|style="font-size:88%"|3-8
|style="font-size:88%" rowspan=2|March 1, 2014
|style="font-size:88%" rowspan=2|2014 Alexander Medved Prizes
|style="text-align:left;font-size:88%;" rowspan=2| Minsk, Belarus
|-
|Win
|24-10
|align=left| Beglan Kanatkhanov
|style="font-size:88%"|2-1
|-
! style=background:white colspan=7 |
|-
|Win
|23-10
|align=left| Micah Burak
|style="font-size:88%"|3-2
|style="font-size:88%" rowspan=4|February 2, 2014
|style="font-size:88%" rowspan=4|2014 Dave Schultz Memorial International
|style="text-align:left;font-size:88%;" rowspan=4| Colorado Springs, Colorado
|-
|Win
|22-10
|align=left| Cameron Simaz
|style="font-size:88%"|TF 10-0
|-
|Loss
|21-10
|align=left| Dustin Kilgore
|style="font-size:88%"|TF 1-12
|-
|Win
|21-9
|align=left| Aibek Usupov
|style="font-size:88%"|TF 10-0
|-
! style=background:white colspan=7 |
|-
|Win
|20-9
|align=left| John Wechter
|style="font-size:88%"|TF 10-0
|style="font-size:88%" rowspan=3|December 21, 2013
|style="font-size:88%" rowspan=3|2013 Minnesota Storm Holiday Cup
|style="text-align:left;font-size:88%;" rowspan=3| Rochester, Minnesota
|-
|Win
|19-9
|align=left| Evan Brown
|style="font-size:88%"|11-4
|-
|Win
|18-9
|align=left| Ryan Flores
|style="font-size:88%"|8-2
|-
! style=background:white colspan=7 |
|-
|Loss
|17-9
|align=left| Wynn Michalak
|style="font-size:88%"|6-9
|style="font-size:88%" rowspan=4|November 9, 2013
|style="font-size:88%" rowspan=4|2013 NYAC Holiday International
|style="text-align:left;font-size:88%;" rowspan=4| New York City, New York
|-
|Win
|17-8
|align=left| Jack Jensen
|style="font-size:88%"|6-2
|-
|Win
|16-8
|align=left| Micah Burak
|style="font-size:88%"|7-0
|-
|Win
|15-8
|align=left| Cayle Byers
|style="font-size:88%"|4-0
|-
! style=background:white colspan=7 |
|-
|Loss
|14-8
|align=left| Jack Jensen
|style="font-size:88%"|Forfeit
|style="font-size:88%" rowspan=4|May 10, 2013
|style="font-size:88%" rowspan=4|2013 Northern Plains Freestyle Senior Regional Championships
|style="text-align:left;font-size:88%;" rowspan=4| Waterloo, Iowa
|-
|Loss
|14-7
|align=left| Scott Schiller
|style="font-size:88%"|4-1, 1–6, 3-9
|-
|Win
|14-6
|align=left| Donnie Horner
|style="font-size:88%"|1-1, 6-0
|-
|Win
|13-6
|align=left| Josh Eckmann
|style="font-size:88%"|TF 0-0, 7–0, 7-0
|-
! style=background:white colspan=7 |
|-
|Loss
|12-6
|align=left| Cayle Byers
|style="font-size:88%"|7-0, 0–2, 0-2
|style="font-size:88%" rowspan=2|April 18, 2013
|style="font-size:88%" rowspan=2|2013 US Open Wrestling Championships
|style="text-align:left;font-size:88%;" rowspan=2| Las Vegas, Nevada
|-
|Loss
|12-5
|align=left| Les Sigman
|style="font-size:88%"|3-3, 0-7
|-
! style=background:white colspan=7 |
|-
|Win
|12-4
|align=left| Jeremy LaTour
|style="font-size:88%"|TF 5–0, 10-1
|style="font-size:88%" rowspan=3|February 10, 2013
|style="font-size:88%" rowspan=3|2013 Cerro Pelado International
|style="text-align:left;font-size:88%;" rowspan=3| Habana, Cuba
|-
|Loss
|11-4
|align=left| Abraham Conyedo
|style="font-size:88%"|1–3, 2-3
|-
|Win
|11-3
|align=left| Raisel Almora
|style="font-size:88%"|TF 5–0, 5-0
|-
! style=background:white colspan=7 |
|-
|Loss
|10-3
|align=left| Jack Jensen
|style="font-size:88%"|2-0, 0–3, 0-3
|style="font-size:88%" rowspan=6|November 10, 2012
|style="font-size:88%" rowspan=6|2012 NYAC Holiday International
|style="text-align:left;font-size:88%;" rowspan=6| New York City, New York
|-
|Win
|10-2
|align=left| Jeremy LaTour
|style="font-size:88%"|TF 6–0, 8-0
|-
|Win
|9-2
|align=left| Evan Brown
|style="font-size:88%"|4-0, 4-0
|-
|Win
|8-2
|align=left| Tanner Hall
|style="font-size:88%"|1-0, 1-0
|-
|Loss
|7-2
|align=left| Cayle Byers
|style="font-size:88%"|0-1, 1-3
|-
|Win
|7-1
|align=left| Aibek Usupov
|style="font-size:88%"|2-0, 4-0
|-
! style=background:white colspan=7 |
|-
|Win
|6-1
|align=left| Scott Schiller
|style="font-size:88%"|7-5, 2-2
|style="font-size:88%" rowspan=7|July 3, 2012
|style="font-size:88%" rowspan=7|2012 ASICS University Freestyle National Championships
|style="text-align:left;font-size:88%;" rowspan=7| Akron, Ohio
|-
|Win
|5-1
|align=left| Micah Burak
|style="font-size:88%"|1-0, 0–1, 1-0
|-
|Loss
|4-1
|align=left| Matt Wilps
|style="font-size:88%"|3-0, 0–1, 0-3
|-
|Win
|4-0
|align=left| Max Huntley
|style="font-size:88%"|1-0, 1-0
|-
|Win
|3-0
|align=left| Nikolas Brown
|style="font-size:88%"|Fall
|-
|Win
|2-0
|align=left| Paul Rands
|style="font-size:88%"|7-0, 6-3
|-
|Win
|1–0
|align=left| Phil Wellington
|style="font-size:88%"|4-0, 7-0
|-

See also
 List of male mixed martial artists

References

External links 
 
 
 

1989 births
Living people
Middleweight mixed martial artists
Mixed martial artists utilizing collegiate wrestling
Mixed martial artists utilizing freestyle wrestling
People from Liberty, Missouri
Mixed martial artists from Missouri
American male mixed martial artists
Ultimate Fighting Championship male fighters
American male sport wrestlers
American sportspeople in doping cases
Doping cases in mixed martial arts